Carnival Island is a motion-controlled party video game developed by Magic Pixel Games and published by Sony Computer Entertainment for PlayStation 3, which utilizes PlayStation Move. It was announced at Electronic Entertainment Expo 2011 on June 5, 2011. It is the first title by Magic Pixel Games, whose team previously worked on the Boom Blox series.

Reception

Carnival Island received "average" reviews according to the review aggregation website Metacritic. In Japan, where the game was ported for release on December 1, 2011 under the name , Famitsu gave it a score of one seven, one eight, and two sevens for a total of 29 out of 40.

References

External links
 at PlayStation.com
 at MagicPixelGames.com

2011 video games
Party video games
PlayStation 3 games
PlayStation 3-only games
PlayStation Move-compatible games
PlayStation Move-only games
Sony Interactive Entertainment games
Video games developed in the United States
Video games set on fictional islands
Multiplayer and single-player video games